The 2012 United States presidential election in New Hampshire took place on November 6, 2012, as part of the 2012 United States presidential election in which all 50 states plus the District of Columbia participated. New Hampshire voters chose four electors to represent them in the Electoral College via a popular vote pitting incumbent Democratic President Barack Obama and his running mate, Vice President Joe Biden, against Republican challenger and former Massachusetts Governor Mitt Romney and his running mate, Congressman Paul Ryan.

New Hampshire voters chose to re-elect President Barack Obama, giving him 51.98% of the vote to Mitt Romney's 46.40%, a Democratic victory margin of 5.58%. Despite Obama winning all of the state's counties in 2008 (the first presidential candidate to do so since George H. W. Bush in 1988, and the first Democrat since Franklin Pierce in 1852) he lost three of them to Romney this election: Belknap, Carroll, and Rockingham.

As of 2020, this is the most recent election in which the Democratic candidate won Coös County. This is also the most recent election that New Hampshire voted to the right of Wisconsin, Michigan or Iowa, and the most recent election it voted to the left of Colorado or Virginia.

Primaries

Democratic
New Hampshire held its primaries on January 10, 2012.  The state is historically the first in the nation to hold presidential primaries, and moved its date up from February after Florida moved its primary date to January 31. Because New Hampshire has a proportional-delegate primary, the state's 12 national delegates will be allocated in proportion to candidates' percent of the popular vote.

Incumbent president Barack Obama won all the delegates and was renominated.

A Democratic presidential candidates debate, held at Saint Anselm College in December 2011, was attended by seven candidates; Obama did not participate.

60,659 votes were cast in the primary. Obama won with 49,080 votes. The total votes cast were more than 30% fewer than in 1996, the last time that a Democratic president ran for re-election without significant opposition.

Republican

The Republican primary took place on Tuesday, January 10, 2012. Former Massachusetts Governor Mitt Romney won the primary.

Campaign
Former Massachusetts Governor Mitt Romney, Texas Congressman Ron Paul, Former Utah Governor Jon Huntsman, Former Speaker of the House Newt Gingrich, and Former Pennsylvania Senator Rick Santorum were heavily contesting and campaigning in the New Hampshire primary. Santorum won the Iowa Caucus on January 3, but no one knew that yet, and believed Romney had won by 8 votes.

Televised debates in New Hampshire were held on January 7, 2012, on ABC News at Saint Anselm College and the following morning on January 8, 2012, on NBC's Meet the Press and MSNBC. All major Republican candidates attended both debates.

Ballot access
In 2012, a record 33 Republican candidates filed to appear on the ballot in New Hampshire, including various single-issue activists, protest candidates, and perennial candidates. For instance, Stewart Greenleaf, who had no interest in becoming President, registered for the ballot to promote the issue of government spending in the Republican Party. Under New Hampshire's lenient ballot access laws, a candidate is only required to pay $1,000 to the state's treasury, and needs no party approval or petitions for placement.

Endorsements
Various newspapers that circulate widely in New Hampshire made endorsements ahead of the New Hampshire primary. While the conservative Union Leader, the only statewide newspaper, endorsed Gingrich, various newspapers endorsed Huntsman, with the Valley News stating that Huntsman was "a candidate whose views are solidly conservative, but not myopically so" and criticizing Romney and Gingrich, stating that "The former has raised the flip-flop to an art form, while the latter has done the same for hypocrisy" and endorsing Huntsman "in the hopes that the cooler heads will prevail in New Hampshire and elsewhere." Romney also received support, including from the Portsmouth Herald of the Seacoast Region.

The New Hampshire Union Leader endorsed Gingrich on November 27.
Foster's Daily Democrat endorsed Romney on December 4.
The Portsmouth Herald and Seacoast Media Group endorsed Romney on December 18.
The Keene Sentinel endorsed Huntsman on December 18.
The Valley News endorsed Huntsman on December 18.
The Conway Daily Sun endorsed Romney on December 21.
The Concord Monitor endorsed Huntsman on December 22.
The Boston Herald endorsed Romney.
The Salmon Press Newspapers group (the Littleton Courier, Berlin Reporter, and Coos County Democrat) endorsed Paul on January 4.
The Nashua Telegraph endorsed Romney on January 5.
The Boston Globe endorsed Huntsman on January 6.
The Eagle-Tribune endorsed Romney on January 6.

Romney led the field in endorsements from New Hampshire Republican elected officials. The New York Times reported that after losing New Hampshire in the 2008 primary to John McCain, Romney devoted considerable time and money to gain the support of New Hampshire Republican figures. Romney's political action committee (PAC) "spread thousands of dollars" to New Hampshire Republican campaigns, including that of youthful Republican state Representative D.J. Bettencourt of the Republican-heavy Salem area, elected state House majority leader in 2011, who is one of Romney's most active supporters. Romney's PAC also donated $25,000 to the New Hampshire Republican State Committee under the chairmanship of prominent New Hampshire party player John H. Sununu, a former governor and White House Chief of Staff. Republican candidates for state Senate and state House, small-town Republican committees, and county sheriffs and district attorneys were all "recipients of [Romney's] largesse." Romney was criticized by some as "buying" endorsements, who referenced "blatantly transactional terms that lie behind the announcements." A large number of officials endorsing Romney, in New Hampshire and in other early primary states, had received contributions first.

By December 11, Romney had already received the endorsement of Ted Gatsas, mayor of Manchester (New Hampshire's largest city) and former state Senate president, and 58 endorsements from state representatives. According to prominent Romney supporter Thomas D. Rath, a former state attorney general described as a Republican power broker, on the eve of the primary the Romney campaign had been endorsed by 11 of 19 Republicans in the State Senate, 73 or 74 of the Republican state representatives, and eight of the 10 sheriffs, as well as the mayor of the largest city. The New York Times reported that so many officials endorsed Romney that it took a three-page pamphlet mailed to New Hampshire Republicans to list them all. The Times reported that Romney-supporting officials "introduce him at virtually every campaign stop, flood gyms and seniors centers with crowds on short notice and attack his Republican rivals."

Of the three Republicans in New Hampshire's congressional delegation, Senator Kelly Ayotte and Representative Charles Bass endorsed Romney, while Frank Guinta declined to endorse a candidate. Executive Council members Raymond S. Burton (who has represented northern New Hampshire since the 1970s), Christopher T. Sununu, and Raymond Wieczorek; State Senate Majority Leader Jeb Bradley, state Senators David Boutin, John Barnes, Jr., Jim Rausch, and Chuck Morse; and former state Senate President Tom Eaton endorsed Romney before December 7. Douglas Dutile, the sheriff of Grafton County, also endorsed Romney.

Senator John McCain of Arizona, who won the New Hampshire Republican primary in 2000 and 2008 and was the Republican nominee for president in 2008, endorsed Romney following the Iowa caucuses and ahead of the New Hampshire primary at a Manchester rally on January 4, despite prior tension between the two in the 2008 primary race.

After Iowa but before the New Hampshire primaries, tea party movement-aligned Buffalo, New York businessman Carl Paladino, the 2010 gubernatorial candidate in nearby New York, supported Gingrich and sharply criticized the rest of the candidates.

New Hampshire House Speaker William L. (Bill) O'Brien endorsed Gingrich, while former House speakers George Roberts, Howard Burns, John Tucker, Donna Sytek, and Doug Scamman endorsed Romney.  State Senators Jim Forsythe, Andy Sanborn, and Ray White endorsed Ron Paul.

Notably, former PA Sen. Rick Santorum gained a disproportionately high number of endorsements (when compared to his pre-Iowa polling in the single digits) in the run up to and including the NH Primary.  At one point Santorum led the entire field of GOP candidates in total number of endorsements (until the entrance of Romney and Perry), and finished with more endorsees than even Huntsman who finished third in the race. This was due in large part to the efforts of Santorum's State Co-chairs: Rep. Dan Tamburello, a current member of the NH House of Representatives from Londonderry who spearheaded the effort, Hon. Bill Cahill, a former Governor's Councilor and member of the NH House, and Claira Monier, a notable Republican party activist who was instrumental in Reagan's NH victory in 1980. Sen Santorum's national campaign manager was by Mike Biundo, who was the architect of former Manchester mayor Frank Guinta's surprising 2010 primary upset for the NH 1st Congressional district; Guinta went on to win the NH-1 district in November 2010 in a decisive victory over Democrat Carol-Shea Porter, who never conceded the race. Other notable endorsements for the Senator included Sen. Jim Luther, Sen. Fenton Groen, former candidate for Governor Karen Testerman, Rep Susan DeLemus, and NH Tea-Party luminary Jerry DeLemus. Testerman and the DeLemus' endorsed Rick after having defected from the Bachmann camp.

Polling

Results

General election

Polling

New Hampshire was rated as a toss-up to Lean D state.  Polling showed a consistent single digit polling lead for President Obama. The average of the final 3 polls had Obama leading Romney 50% to 47.3%.

Results

By county

Counties that swung from Democratic to Republican
 Belknap (largest city: Laconia)
 Carroll (largest town: Conway)
 Rockingham (largest town: Derry)

Results by congressional district
Obama won both congressional districts.

See also
 United States presidential elections in New Hampshire
 Presidency of Barack Obama
 New Hampshire primary
 New Hampshire Republican Party
 2012 Republican Party presidential debates and forums
 2012 Republican Party presidential primaries
 Results of the 2012 Republican Party presidential primaries

References

External links
New Hampshire Republican State Committee Official Website
News coverage at the Concord Monitor
News coverage at the New Hampshire Union Leader
New Hampshire Republican primary, 2012 at Daily Telegraph
 New Hampshire Republican primary, 2012 at the Guardian UK
The Green Papers: for New Hampshire
The Green Papers: Major state elections in chronological order
Official Results for 2012 Election in New Hampshire

New Hampshire
United States President
2012